George Howse was an Anglican priest in Ireland in the mid-18th century.

Howse was born in Bandon, County Cork and educated at Trinity College, Dublin. He was Archdeacon of Dromore  from 1742 until 1770.

Notes

Archdeacons of Dromore
Alumni of Trinity College Dublin
18th-century Irish Anglican priests